The SS Carsbreck was a British cargo steamship. She was sunk while carrying supplies to the UK in the Second World War.

Early years and convoy SC 7
Ayrshire Dockyard Co Ltd, Irvine, North Ayrshire built the ship, completing her in September 1936 as Coulbeg. Her first owner was Dornoch Shipping Co Ltd, which registered her in Glasgow and contracted Lambert Bros Ltd to manage her. In 1938 the Carslogie Steam Ship Co bought her, renamed her Carsbreck and contracted Honeyman and Company of Glasgow to manage her. She sailed in a number of convoys in the Second World War, carrying supplies to and from the UK. She was part of Convoy SC 7 in October 1940, carrying a cargo of timber. The convoy was overwhelmed by a wolfpack of U-boats, and at 0204 hours on 18 October , commanded by Heinrich Liebe, torpedoed and badly damaged Carsbreck.

Convoy HG-75 and sinking
Carsbreck later formed part of Convoy HG 75 from Almería to Barrow-in-Furness. She carried a cargo of 6,000 tons of iron ore. At 0636 hours on 24 October 1941 Reinhard Suhren's  sighted the convoy and fired five torpedoes at it. Three ships were hit, and all three sank: ,  and Carsbreck. Twenty four of the Carsbreck’s complement were killed: 19 crewmen, four DEMS gunners and the Master. 16 crew members and two DEMS gunners survived and were rescued by the Free French Elan-class minesweeping aviso Commandant Duboc. They were transferred to the CAM ship . Two days later  torpedoed and damaged Ariguani. She was abandoned, but later was re-boarded and towed to Gibraltar. The Flower-class corvette  picked up Carsbrecks survivors and transferred them to the V-class destroyer , which took them to Gibraltar.

Footnotes

References

 

1936 ships
Ships built on the River Clyde
Maritime incidents in October 1940
Maritime incidents in October 1941
Ships sunk by German submarines in World War II
Steamships of the United Kingdom
World War II merchant ships of the United Kingdom
World War II shipwrecks in the Atlantic Ocean